Amurensin A is an oligostilbene isolated from the roots of Vitis amurensis. It is a partially oxidized resveratrol dimer with a C8-C8' connection.

References 

Resveratrol oligomers
Stilbenoid dimers
Grape